Petr Kaspřák (born 17 January 1984) is a Czech footballer who currently plays for SV Jauerling in Austria.

References

External links
 
 
 
 

1984 births
Living people
People from Bohumín
Czech footballers
Czech First League players
FK Viktoria Žižkov players
1. FC Slovácko players
Pogoń Szczecin players
AS Trenčín players
FC Nitra players
Slovak Super Liga players
2. Liga (Slovakia) players
Association football midfielders
Expatriate footballers in Poland
Expatriate footballers in Slovakia
Expatriate footballers in Austria
Czech expatriate sportspeople in Poland
Czech expatriate sportspeople in Slovakia
Czech expatriate sportspeople in Austria
Tur Turek players
Sportspeople from the Moravian-Silesian Region